The 1921 SIAA men's basketball tournament took place February 25–March 1, 1921, at Municipal Auditorium in Atlanta, Georgia. The Kentucky Wildcats won their first Southern Intercollegiate Athletic Association title, led by head coach George Buchheit.

The Kentucky Wildcats defeated the pre-tournament favorite Georgia Bulldogs, on a free throw by Bill King. Georgia beat rival Georgia Tech in the semifinals.

Bracket

* Overtime game

Championship

All-Southern Tournament Team

See also
List of Southern Conference men's basketball champions

References

Tournament
Southern Intercollegiate men's basketball tournament
Southern Intercollegiate men's basketball tournament
Southern Intercollegiate men's basketball tournament